Shadows on the Sun is the second studio album by American rapper Brother Ali. It was released on May 27, 2003 on Rhymesayers Entertainment. It was produced entirely by Ant of Atmosphere. The album received almost unanimous critical acclaim.

Track listing
All tracks by Brother Ali & Ant except 7 and 14 by the formers and Slug

Personnel 
Credits for Shadows on the Sun adapted from Allmusic.

 Ant – Scratching, Engineer, Executive Producer, Mixing, Beats
 Brother Ali – Vocals, Engineer, Executive Producer, Mixing
 Sean Daley – Executive Producer
 Emily Lazar – Mastering
 Joe Mabbott – Engineer, Mixing
 Dan Monick – Photography
 Brent "Abu Siddiq" Sayers – Executive Producer
 Siddiq – Design, Layout Design

References

External links
 Shadows on the Sun at Discogs
 Rhymesayers Entertainment

2003 albums
Brother Ali albums
Rhymesayers Entertainment albums
Albums produced by Ant (producer)